Renée Elmina Leon  is a senior Australian public servant. From 18 September 2017 until February 2020, she had been Secretary of the Department of Human Services, which is now known as Services Australia. In August 2021 she became Vice Chancellor of Charles Sturt University.

Life and career
Leon graduated from the Australian National University with a double degree of Bachelor of Arts and Bachelor of Laws with First Class Honours. In 1995, she was awarded the Sir Robert Menzies Memorial Scholarship in Law, leading to a Masters in Law from Cambridge University.

From 2006 to 2009, Leon held the position of Chief Executive of the ACT Department of Justice and Community Safety. She served as Deputy Secretary in the Attorney-General's Department and in the Department of the Prime Minister and Cabinet from May 2009 to September 2013. She was awarded a Public Service Medal in June 2013 for outstanding public service to public administration and law in leadership roles in the Australian Capital Territory and the Commonwealth.

She has served on the Boards of the Australian Institute of Criminology, the National Australia Day Council, and the Australia New Zealand Policing Advisory Agency, and was a member of the Council of the Order of Australia.

In September 2013, Leon was appointed Secretary of the newly established Department of Employment.  On August 24 2021 her appointment as Vice Chancellor of Charles Sturt University was announced in an email to staff by the University Council.

In February 2023, at hearings at the Robodebt Royal Commission, it was revealed that Renee Leon was the public servant that ended the illegal Robodebt scheme, after Ministers had refused to shut down the scheme despite numerous reports that the programme was illegal. Renee Leon has garnered widespread public praise for her courage and intergrity in ending the scheme, a decision that resulted in her being sacked as Secretary of the Department of Human Services.

References

Living people
Year of birth missing (living people)
Place of birth missing (living people)
Australian public servants
Recipients of the Public Service Medal (Australia)
Australian National University alumni